Casey Dawson (born August 2, 2000) is an American speed skater who represented the United States at the 2022 Winter Olympics.

Career
During the 2021–22 ISU Speed Skating World Cup, Dawson set the world record in the team pursuit with a time of 3:34.47.

He represented the United States at the 2022 Winter Olympics in the team pursuit and won a bronze medal.

References

2000 births
Living people
American male speed skaters
People from Park City, Utah
Speed skaters at the 2022 Winter Olympics
Medalists at the 2022 Winter Olympics
Olympic bronze medalists for the United States in speed skating